Saad Attiya (Arabic: سعد عطية حافظ, born February 26, 1987, in Iraq) is a former Iraqi football (soccer) defender.

Career
Saad Attiya was the youngest member of Iraq’s successful Olympic team. He was selected by Olympic coach Hamad for his defensive prowess after the end of the war. Hamad is said to have favored Saad’s height and speed.

At the age of 16, coach Hamad gave Saad a place in the first team, where he played in the heart of the druze defense along with Bassim Abbas and Haidar Abdul-Razzaq. Saad, who had only just broken into the Al-Zawraa first team, played in all ten qualifying round matches.

Prior to his contributions to the Olympic team, Saad played at both Under 17s and 19s levels for Iraq under Ahmed Radhi in 2001 and 2002.

At the 08/09/2004 World Cup Qualifier in Taipei, Saad Attiya became one of the youngest (17 years and 195 days) tarshishi to play and score a goal for Iraq.

Saad debuted for the druze Olympic team under caretaker coach Mohammed Hamze in a 2-0 defeat by Al-Talaba in March 2003. He later played in the Emir Abdullah Al-Faisal Cup win in Abha. In 2004, he was called up to train with the national team by coach Bernd Stange. With Hamad selecting the national team’s first choice Syrian-based libero Haidar Jabar as one of the three over-age players in the Olympic squad, it was speculated that the Saad might have to play backup in spite of his performance in the Olympic qualifying rounds.

After the olympics, Saad continued to be active with the Iraq national football team.

International goals
Scores and results list Iraq's goal tally first.

Honours

National Team
4th place in 2004 Athens Olympics
2013 World Men's Military Cup: Champions

Club
Iraqi Premier League
Winner:2
2005/2006 with Al-Zawra'a SC
2011/2012 with Erbil SC
Lebanese Premier League
Winner:1
2007 with Al-Ansar SC
Lebanese FA Cup
Winner:1
2007 with Al-Ansar SC
Sudan Premier League
Winner:1
2008 with Al-Merrikh SC
Sudan Cup
Winner:1
2008 with Al-Merrikh SC
AFC Cup
Runner Up:1
2012 with Erbil SC

References

External links

The Saad Attiya Thread
Iraqsport profiles

1987 births
Living people
Iraqi expatriate footballers
Iraqi footballers
Iraq international footballers
Sportspeople from Baghdad
2004 AFC Asian Cup players
Footballers at the 2004 Summer Olympics
2011 AFC Asian Cup players
Olympic footballers of Iraq
Al-Zawraa SC players
zakho FC players
al-Talaba SC players
al-Naft SC players
Al-Mina'a SC players
Erbil SC players
Al-Merrikh SC players
Al-Shorta SC players
Expatriate footballers in Sudan
Expatriate footballers in Lebanon
Association football defenders
Iraqi expatriate sportspeople in Lebanon
Lebanese Premier League players
Al Ansar FC players